Nexus Airlines was a Liverpool-based low-cost airline created by 18-year-old entrepreneur Daniel Reilly. The airline flew from Liverpool to Spain and the Canary Islands.

History
When he was 16, business entrepreneur Daniel Reilly took flying lessons. At the age of 18, Nexus Airlines was founded. A single Boeing 737 was leased from Futura, and Reilly started flying passengers from Liverpool John Lennon to Spanish airports.

Closure

Later, at an unknown time, one of the major investors of Nexus Airlines filed for bankruptcy; claiming Nexus Airlines as an asset. This meant the closure of the airline was required.

Reilly later founded JetXtra.com in 2012.

Destinations

Before ceasing operations, Nexus Airlines flew to the following destinations:

Europe
United Kingdom
 Liverpool John Lennon Airport base
Spain
 Tenerife Airport
 Lanzarote Airport
Canary Islands
 Gran Canaria Airport

Fleet

See also
 List of defunct airlines of the United Kingdom

References

Defunct airlines of the United Kingdom
Airlines established in 2005